Johnsons (formerly, Klamath) is an unincorporated community in Humboldt County, California.

History
Johnsons was a settlement in the former Klamath County, California. A fairly isolated and small Yurok ancestral village, Johnsons is located within the Yurok reservation along the Klamath River and is known for its excellent fishing and serenity. Electricity was made available to the community in 2019 after a long-standing utilization of solar & generator power.

References

Settlements formerly in Klamath County, California
Unincorporated communities in Humboldt County, California
Unincorporated communities in California